Priozerny is a rural locality (a settlement) in Aksaraysky Selsoviet, Krasnoyarsky District, Astrakhan Oblast, Russia. The population was 18 as of 2010. There are 2 streets.

Geography 
Priozerny is located 41 km north of Krasny Yar (the district's administrative centre) by road. Maly Aral is the nearest rural locality.

References 

Rural localities in Krasnoyarsky District, Astrakhan Oblast